An earthquake, rated at IX (Violent) on the Mercalli intensity scale, struck northern Italy and Germany on 3 January 1117. The epicentre of the first shock was near Verona, the city which suffered the most damage. The outer wall of the Verona Arena partially collapsed, and the standing portion was damaged in a later earthquake of 1183. After the first shock of 3 January, seismic activity persisted for months, striking on 12 January, 4 June, 1 July, 1 October, and 30 December.

A single earthquake or several? 
Recent studies, however, suggest that it was not a major, single event, but instead a series of shocks in the areas of Verona (west Veneto) and Cremona (Lower Lombardy), which happened over a period of a few days or within a few hours. Other earthquakes may have hit as far south as Pisa (northwest Tuscany) and as north as Augsburg (southwest Bavaria), as distinct events, on the same days. The earthquake was recorded in the catalogs of 7 countries: Italy, Germany, Austria, France, Belgium, Switzerland, and the Iberian Peninsula. In a study published in 2005 in one of the leading scientific journals in the field, the Verona earthquake was shown to be a sequence of 3 different earthquakes, unrelated to each other, in different sub-regions that occurred on the same date - 3 January 1117: the first occurred between 02:00 and 03:00 in the morning (UTC). The earthquake mainly affected the area of southern Germany and Salzburg, Austria today. Its magnitude was about 6.4 and the maximum seismic intensity was VII-VIII on the MCS scale. The second was that of Verona, which was the largest and most powerful of the three, and it took place in the afternoon around 14:30 - 15:30 (UTC). Its magnitude was approximately a level 7, and the maximum seismic intensity was IX on the MCS scale. The third earthquake also occurred at a similar time to the second earthquake, but in the area of Pisa in northern Tuscany. The earthquake caused the collapse of many towers, buildings, and bell towers in Pisa, which resulted in the loss of life. The distance between the second and third earthquake zones is about 180 kilometers, and the Apennine mountain range separates them. For this reason, some scientists [need citation] believe that it is a separate earthquake, despite the coincidence of the time of the earthquake and the area. The maximum seismic intensity in the third quake was VII-VIII on the MCS scale. The magnitude of the quake could not be estimated. This earthquake was preceded by a foreshock early in the morning that did not cause any damage.

Damage 
The earthquake in Verona in 1117 was the strongest recorded in the history of northern Italy. It was not only felt in Verona, but across northern Italy, from Cividale to Pavia, south to Pisa and north to Switzerland. Outside of Verona, the most damaged areas were Milan, Bergamo, Brescia, Venice, Treviso, Modena, Parma, and Cremona. The main churches of  Padua all suffered major damage. News of the earthquake reached Montecassino and Reims. The Milanese chronicler Landolfo Iuniore reported that the church synods needed to be carried out in the open air due to the destruction. In Germany, damage was also extensive. The Michaelskirche in Bamberg, the abbey at Brauweiler, and buildings in Rottenburg am Neckar, Constance, Meersburg, and Fénis were all reported damaged. Many churches, monasteries, and ancient monuments were destroyed or seriously damaged in Verona itself, eliminating much of Verona's early medieval architecture and providing space for a massive Romanesque rebuilding. In the province of Veneto, many churches were severely damaged: in Brescia, Cremona, in the northern part of the Emilia plain and along the central route of the Adige river, and partial collapse of churches in Padua, Piacenza, Parma, and Modena.

See also
List of earthquakes in Italy
List of historical earthquakes
Verona Arena

Notes

Sources

External links
 Page on the 1117 Verona earthquake from the CFTI5 Catalogue of Strong Earthquakes in Italy (461 BC – 1997) and Mediterranean Area (760 B.C. – 1500) Guidoboni E., Ferrari G., Mariotti D., Comastri A., Tarabusi G., Sgattoni G., Valensise G. (2018) (in Italian)

12th-century earthquakes
1117 Verona
1117 in Europe
12th century in Italy
1110s in the Holy Roman Empire
History of Verona